Eugen Satală (born 8 May 1950) is a Romanian former sports shooter. He competed in the 300 m rifle, three positions event at the 1972 Summer Olympics.

References

1950 births
Living people
Romanian male sport shooters
Olympic shooters of Romania
Shooters at the 1972 Summer Olympics
Sportspeople from Focșani